Nathalie Herreman and Pascale Paradis were the defending champions but only Herreman competed that year with Sophie Amiach.

Amiach and Herreman lost in the quarterfinals to Claudia Kohde-Kilsch and Helena Suková.

Isabelle Demongeot and Nathalie Tauziat won in the final 6–3, 6–3 against Kohde-Kilsch and Suková.

Seeds
Champion seeds are indicated in bold text while text in italics indicates the round in which those seeds were eliminated.

 Claudia Kohde-Kilsch /  Helena Suková (final)
 Jana Novotná /  Catherine Suire (semifinals)
 Isabelle Demongeot /  Nathalie Tauziat (champions)
 Belinda Cordwell /  Dianne van Rensburg (quarterfinals)

Draw

External links
 1988 European Indoors Doubles draw

Zurich Open
1988 WTA Tour